The Namibia Cricket Board, known commercially as Cricket Namibia, is the official governing body of the sport of cricket in Namibia. Its current headquarters is in Windhoek, Namibia. Cricket Namibia is Namibia's representative at the International Cricket Council and has been an Associate Member of that body since 1992. It is also a Member of the African Cricket Association.

History

Board Members

President                                 - Dr Rudie van Vuuren

Vice President                            - Mr Polly Negongo

Member                                    - Mr Daneel van der Walt

Member                                    - Mr Andre Snyman

Member                                    - Mrs Hester Khan

Member                                    - Mr Deon Kotze

CEO of Cricket Namibia                    - Mr Peter Forster

Operations Manager                        - Mr John Heynes

Domestic leagues

Three Ships Premier League (50 overs & T20)

CCD I (Centre of Cricket Development)

United I

Wanderers I

Welwitschia

WHSOBCC (Windhoek High School Old Boy's Cricket Club) 

Three Ships 1st Division League Central (40 overs & T20)

CCD II

United II

Wanderers II

WHSOBCC II

WHSOBCC V

Gobabis 1st XI

Zebra 1

Mariental

Three Ships 1st Division League Coastal (40 overs & T20)

Blue Waters

JCCA

Sparta

Swakopmund 1

Swakopmund 2

Three Ships 2nd Division League Coastal

CCD 3

WHSOBCC 3

Zebra 2

Mariental 2

Otjiwarongo

Oranjemund

Oshiponga NDF

Green Mambas

Women's cricket teams

Zebra

Blue Waters

Sparta

WHS

Pro-Ed

Grounds

Defence Force Ground

References

Trans Namib Ground

United Ground, Windhoek

Wanderers Cricket Ground

Windhoek High School

WAP Cricket Ground

Sparta Cricket Ground

Doc Jubber Cricket Field

Walvis Bay Cricket Oval

Swakopmund Vineta Cricket Field

External links
Official site of Namibia Cricket Board

Namibia
cricket
Cricket in Namibia